William Hamilton Maxwell (30 June 1792 in Newry, County Down, Ireland – 29 December 1850 in Musselburgh, Scotland) was an Irish novelist.

He was educated at Trinity College, Dublin.  He claimed to have entered the British Army and seen service in the Peninsular War and the Battle of Waterloo, but this is generally believed to be untrue. Afterwards he took orders, but was deprived of his living for non-residence.

His novels, O'Hara (1825), and Stories from Waterloo (1834) started the school of rollicking military fiction, which culminated in the novels of Charles Lever. Maxwell also wrote a Life of the Duke of Wellington (1839–1841), and a History of the Irish Rebellion of 1798  (1845) - written in a spirit hostile to the rebels, and accompanied with similarly hostile illustrations by George Cruikshank.

Maxwell married Mary Dobbin, daughter of Thomas Dobbin.

Publications 
 Stories of waterloo : and other tales (1829)
 Wild Sports of the West. With Legendary Tales, and Local Sketches (1832)
 The Field Book, or Sports and pastimes of the United Kingdom compiled from the best authorities ancient and modern (1833)
 Captain Blake of the Rifles; or, My Life (1836)
 The Bivouac; Or, Stories of the Peninsular War (1837)
 Life of the Duke of Wellington (1839)
 History of the Irish rebellion in 1798 (1845)
 Hill-side and border sketches: with legends of the Cheviots and the Lammermuir (1847)
 The Fortunes of Hector O'Halloran, And His Man Mark Antony O'Toole (1853)
 Life, Military and Civil, of the Duke of Wellington (1865)
 The Victories of Wellington and the British Armies (1891)

Footnotes

External links

1792 births
1850 deaths
Alumni of Trinity College Dublin
People from Newry
19th-century Irish novelists